Chilostoma ziegleri is a species of medium-sized, air-breathing land snail, a terrestrial pulmonate gastropod mollusk in the family Helicidae, the true snails.  This species occurs in Austria, Italy, and Slovenia.

The threats, if any, to this species are unknown, but it appears to have a declining population.

References

Chilostoma
Gastropods described in 1836
Taxonomy articles created by Polbot